is a Japanese girl idol group, belonging to Section 3 of the talent agency Stardust Promotion, and its abbreviation is "Tokisen (とき宣)".

Currently, the group has 6 members.

"Tokimeki" means "sparking joy" and "Sendenbu" means "publicity club" in English. Their Fans are called  or "publicity club members", and the color of "sendenbuin" is orange. The group’s official character was created on November 20, 2018, with its name, having been chosen from suggestions sent in by the public.

Members

Former Members

Timeline

History

Until their first album release 

 2015

Tokimeki Sendenbu was formed as a limited-time group of 5 members on April 11,  and their first single was released on June 24. On December 27, their first solo concert was held, and all the members expressed their intention to continue group activities.

 2016

They released a major debut single on November 9.
 2017
At the end of the event on March 20, Mako Nagasaka withdrew from the group and retired from the entertainment world. On April 7, the radio program "Hare Tokidoki Tokimeki Sendenbu" started broadcasting. On June 18, Bambi Fujimoto and Sala Odaka appeared as new members, and they officially joined the concert on July 22.

 2018
They released first album on April 11.

Pre-renaming 

 2018

At the end of the event on October 7, Sala Odaka withdrew from the group. On October 14, An Julia joined as "2nd generation Tokimeki Purple".
 2019
On April 10, they released the first double-A-side single after transferring to avex trax. At the solo concert on December 21, they achieved the goal of filling Nakano Sunplaza.

 2020

On February 10, it was announced that Fujimoto Bambi would withdraw from the group. Due to the epidemic of the COVID-19, the last concert with no audience was live-streamed on March 29, and officially withdrawn on March 31.

Post-renaming 

 2020
On April 1, the name was changed from Tokimeki Sendenbu to Cho Tokimeki Sendenbu, and Aki Suda joined as "Cho Tokimeki Lemon". The Zepp tour was scheduled at four venues nationwide in May, but was canceled due to a state of emergency due to the epidemic of the COVID-19. The first live performance for Aki Suda was performed on July 18 at Zepp Haneda with no audience, and it was live-streamed on YouTube for free.

On August 26, the first single since the change of member, "Tomorrow's Saikyousetu!!" was released, and on December 23, the first album since the transfer to avex trax and the group name change, "Tokimeki ga Subete" was released.

 2021

On February 15, their paid official fan club was founded. The first fan club event was held at Sanrio Puroland on April 24. On May 29 and 30, the first arena solo live performances will be held at Arena Tachikawa Tachihi. From August 21 to September 5, Zepp tour was held at 5 locations (Sapporo, Nagoya, Fukuoka, Tokyo and Osaka) nationwide. On December 26, Avex Pictures hosts the world-wide live stream of Cho Tokimeki ♡ Sendenbu's Doki Doki ♡ Christmas Party 2021.

The song "Suki!" became a boom on TikTok, and the mini-album "Suki Suki Suki Suki Suki Suki!", Which includes the re-recorded and rearranged version, "Suki! ~Cho ver~", was released on September 29. The YouTube video "Suki! ~Cho ver~ Live Edit ver" exceeded 1 million times on July 8.  On December 17, they performed on TikTokMusicNight 2021Rewind.

 2022

On March 9, the number of subscribers to the official YouTube channel exceeded 100,000. From July 10 to September 30, Zepp tour was held at 6 locations nationwide with Sanrio Characters. The biggest live ever in the history of the group is scheduled for October 22 at Makuhari Messe.

Discography

Singles

Albums

EP's

Digital Singles 

  :Released at January 30,2023.

Solo-Singles

References

External links 
Official website

Japanese idol groups
Japanese girl groups
Japanese pop music groups
Child musical groups
Musical groups established in 2015
2015 establishments in Japan
Stardust Promotion artists
Musical groups from Tokyo